The 1920 Kilkenny County Council election was held on Monday, 7 June 1920.

Electoral areas

County council

District councils

Results by party

Results by electoral area

Ballyragget

Kilkenny

Piltown

Thomastown

References 

1920 Irish local elections
1920